The 2018–19 VCU Rams women's basketball team represents Virginia Commonwealth University during the 2018–19 NCAA Division I women's basketball season. The Rams were led by fifth year head coach Beth O'Boyle. The Rams were members of the Atlantic 10 Conference and play their home games at the Stuart C. Siegel Center. They finished the season 24–10, 13–3 in A-10 play to share the regular season title with Fordham. They advanced to the championship game of the A-10 women's tournament where they lost to Fordham. They received an automatic bid to the WNIT where they defeated Charlotte in the first round before losing to Virginia Tech in the second round.

Roster

Schedule

|-
!colspan=9 style=| Non-conference regular season

|-
!colspan=9 style=| A-10 regular season

|-
!colspan=9 style=| Atlantic 10 Women's Tournament

|-
!colspan=9 style=| WNIT

Rankings
2018–19 NCAA Division I women's basketball rankings

See also
 2018–19 VCU Rams men's basketball team

References

VCU
VCU Rams women's basketball
VCU Rams women's basketball
VCU Rams women's basketball seasons
VCU